Adventure in Dairyland is a television serial that aired in 1956 on ABC as part of the second season of The Mickey Mouse Club.  The serial starred Mouseketeer Annette Funicello and Sammy Ogg of Spin and Marty and featured Kevin Corcoran in his first Walt Disney production.

Plot
Annette Funicello and Sammy Ogg visit the 560-acre McCandless Sunny Acres Dairy Farm in Wisconsin.  They get to know the members of the McCandless family and learn about the operation of a dairy farm.

Tie-in
The serial was produced in co-operation with the American Dairy Association who published a 16-page paper pamphlet that presented material from the serial.

References

External links

Television series by Disney
American Broadcasting Company original programming
Black-and-white American television shows
The Mickey Mouse Club serials
1956 American television series debuts
1956 American television series endings
Television shows set in Madison, Wisconsin
English-language television shows